The Chesapeake Beach railway station is a historic railway station located at Chesapeake Beach, Calvert County, Maryland, United States. It is composed of two one-story, hip-roofed sections; one part was once an open passenger boarding area that was later enclosed for storage. The station was erected in 1898, for the Chesapeake Beach Railway. It is now operated as a railway museum.

The Chesapeake Beach Railway Station was listed on the National Register of Historic Places in 1980.

History

The station was originally opened as a stop along the railway when Otto Mears sought to create a resort town at the Chesapeake Bay between Baltimore and Washington, D.C. Mears and his business associates established hotels, beaches, casinos and a boardwalk. On June 9, 1900, the first train arrived at the station. However, 35 years later, the Great Depression and the growing popularity of cars led to a decline in business. The last train left the station on April 15, 1935.

Museum

The station was dedicated as a museum to the Calvert County Board of Commissioners by Gerald and Fred Donovan in 1979. The Calvert County Historical Society is responsible for maintaining the building and its exhibits. The museum features artifacts, exhibits and programs commemorating the Chesapeake Beach Railway and local history.

See also
Chesapeake Beach Railway
Chesapeake Beach, Maryland

References

External links
, including photo from 2000, at Maryland Historical Trust
Chesapeake Beach Railway Museum
United States Department of the Interior, National Park Service: National Register of Historic Places -- Nomination Form

Railway stations on the National Register of Historic Places in Maryland
Railroad museums in Maryland
Museums in Calvert County, Maryland
Railway stations in the United States opened in 1898
1898 establishments in Maryland
Museums established in 1979
1979 establishments in Maryland
National Register of Historic Places in Calvert County, Maryland
Transportation buildings and structures in Calvert County, Maryland
Former railway stations in Maryland